It was initially started as Dhanbad Katras rail line and was extended up to Chandrapura in 1930. The first train in this route ran from Dhanbad to Katrasgarh. Dhanbad–Chandrapura line was a railway passing through Railways in Jharia Coalfield lying between  the Dhanbad line on the north and the Chandrapura in the south. The rail line was laid late nineteenth century by extending the Grand Chord to Katrasgarh via Dhanbad in 1894. This line was opened in 1930. 

The Netaji SC Bose Gomoh-Chandrapura-Dhanbad sector was electrified in 1986–87. The line closed due to a mine fire had reached tracks, thus making it unsafe for use. The railway also suspended good traffic on the line which has nine loading side of Bharat Coking Coal Limited. The line was reopened on 24 February 2019 due to agitations & protests by the people of the region.

Trains 

 Howrah–Ranchi Shatabdi Express
 Secunderabad–Darbhanga Express
 Dhanbad–Alappuzha Express
 Patna–Hatia Patliputra Express
 Ranchi–Dumka Intercity Express
 Dhanbad–Dumka Intercity Express
 Vananchal Express
 Jaynagar–Ranchi Express
 Howrah–Ranchi Intercity Express
 Dhanbad–Bhubaneswar Garib Rath Express
 Ranchi–Bhagalpur Express
 Ranchi–Kamakhya Express
 Ranchi–New Jalpaiguri Express
 Surat–Malda Town Express
 Jhargram–Dhanbad MEMU
 Dhanbad Muri Passenger
 Bokaro Steel City Howrah Fast Passenger
 Dhanbad–Ranchi Passenger

See also 

 Railways in Jharia Coalfield

References

|

5 ft 6 in gauge railways in India

Rail transport in Jharkhand
Coal mining in India
Mining in Jharkhand
Transport in Dhanbad
1930 establishments in India
Railway lines opened in 1930
Closed railway lines in India
2017 disestablishments in India
Railway lines closed in 2017
Railway lines opened in 2019